The Hong Kong Commercial Daily (HKCD) is a Chinese state-owned newspaper, published in broadsheet format in Hong Kong and dubbed “China’s international media window” by the central government. Established in 1952, it was the first financial newspaper in the Chinese language. It is one of the few newspapers authorized by the Hong Kong SAR government to publicize legal announcements, and also the only Hong Kong newspaper allowed to be circulated freely in mainland China. It is controlled by the Hong Kong Liaison Office and has a branch office in Shenzhen.

History 
The HKCD was founded on October 11, 1952, at a price of 10 HK cents. It's stated aim was to serve as the voice of the local Hong Kong commerce with a focus on worldwide economies especially in Hong Kong and China. It also covered sports and on weekends offered columns and serialized short stories with pictures.

Early coverage of horse and dog racing was curtailed by the government in the early 70s, so as not to promote gambling, leading to a severe decline in circulation.

In December 1989, a majority shareholding was acquired by the Joint Publishing (HK) Company Limited (the joint company of The Commercial Press (H.K.) Ltd, Chung Hwa Book Co., and Joint Publishing) for HK$160 million.

In 1995, HKCD launched a mainland edition in cooperation with mainland publishing companies. Since 1996, an online version has been available.

In May 2005, the paper was upgraded priced at HK$3 in Hong Kong and overseas while in Mainland China it sold for 3 yuan within Guangdong Province and 5 yuan in other provinces. 
The new version of the paper emphasizes business news from Hong Kong and the Pearl River Delta, along with some sports coverage.

In 2015, assistant editor-in-chief Long Zhenyang was placed under "political measures" for comments he made during the 2014 Hong Kong protests and regarding the demolition of churches in Zhejiang. For the following year, he did not work as an editor but was allowed to continue writing, and in February 2016 resigned and sought political asylum in the United States, comparing the sociopolitical climate in Chinese politics to the Cultural Revolution, and saying that "All hope for social reform and reforms to China’s political system, have now been extinguished."

Contents
A typical edition contains about 30 pages. The largest sections are:

News
News highlights 
China News 
Hong Kong News 
World News

Business
The Stock and Property Markets of China 
Analysis of oil prices, stock markets in Hong Kong, China and the world
Public announcements and disclosure of revenue of companies in Hong Kong and China

Property
Analysis of the property market and investment opportunities in Hong Kong and China
Latest Development of Chinese Provinces

Special features
 Interviews: Special Features on Successful and outstanding businessmen in Hong Kong and China

Sports
 Horse Racing news
 World football news

Leisure
Food and restaurants
Travel in China
Book review

Technology
A special issue called  I.T.Net  is published every Wednesday along with the newspaper.

Editor

Cheng Xi Tian (陳鍚添)
Cheng Xi Tian is the current chief editor of the HKCD. Cheng was born on 8 February 1941 in Shanghai. Before he became the Chief Editor and Deputy of the HKCD, Cheng had been the editor of Shenzhen Publishing Group. At present, he is also a part-time professor in Renmin University of China (RUC) (中國人民大學) and Wuhan University (WHU) (武漢大學). He is a graduate from journalism of Renmin University of China in 1966 and has been working in the field of journalism for more than thirty years. Since he has written a number of newsletters, argumentative writings, reports, biography and prose etc., he was given the title "Unique Journalist" by Deng Xiao Ping(鄧小平) in 1992. On 26 March 1992, Cheng's Chinese publication 《东方风来满眼春》 highlighted the success of his career. This publication has won many awards in the press media of mainland China, e.g. "The first award of Chinese News" (中國新聞獎一等獎), "Special prize of Guangdong News" (廣東新聞獎特別獎), etc. In 2000, he was awarded the most honorable prize in the press in mainland (韜奮新聞獎).

Board
The paper is state-owned, controlled by the Liaison Office of the Central Government.

Chairman and CEO

Huang Yang Lue (黃揚略)
Mr Huang Yang Lue is currently the chairman of the board of directors as well as the CEO of The HKCD. He was born in Suwen, Guangdong, and graduated from Zhongshan University(中山大學)in 1982. Immediately after his graduation, he entered the Xinhua News Agency in the Guangdong branch, where he worked as a reporter, assistant director and vice-president. He also is a part-time Professor at the Business School of Jinan University(暨南大學). In September 2002, he was appointed head of the Shenzhen News Group .

Advisory board
There are more than 50 contributing advisors of the HKCD. For example: Dr. Tsang Hin Chi (曾憲梓), Dr. Leo Lee Tung-hai( 李東海), Dr. Vincent Lo Hong-sui (羅康瑞), Dr. Robin Chan Yau-hing (陳有慶), Mr. Timothy Fok Tsun-ting (霍震霆)and Mr. Chan Wing-kee (陳永棋) .

Readership

Target reader groups
The target reader groups include investors and business executives in both China and Hong Kong, mainly from the Pearl River Delta and especially the Special Economic Zones.  Employees of some Hong Kong companies which have based their businesses in mainland China, and politically-minded individuals with an interest in the HKSAR-PRC relation, are also an important target group. Its worldwide readership includes people from Malaysia, Thailand, Singapore, the US, Canada, Australia, UK, Germany, the Netherlands, Norway, Indonesia (starts 28 Sep 2009, officially issued), etc..

Ranking by readers
According to a survey by the Department of Journalism and Communication, Chinese University of Hong Kong, the credibility of HKCD is ranked 23rd among the media (for example, newspapers and magazines) in Hong Kong, scoring 4.9, while the most credible is the Hong Kong Economic Journal(scoring 7.38).

Readers' perception

RTHK  and Breakthrough  have conducted surveys and questionnaires for Hong Kong readers and journalists in Year 1998 and 2001 respectively.  The findings reflect the credibility, political stance and popularity of a number of Hong Kong newspaper among the public.

The result of the surveys has been shown in the diagram.

Publication

Installments
In addition to reporting up-to-date business and financial issues, it also contains intellectual serials. For example, many of the martial arts novels written by Jinyong(also known as Louis Cha) from the 1950s like "Sword Stained With Royal Blood"《碧血劍》in 1956, The Legend of the Condor Heroes"《射鵰英雄傳》in 1957 etc, were published as installments in the Hong Kong Commercial Daily.

Books
HKCD also publishes various kinds of books, while most are in Chinese, including "The Last episode of Ten Colonels"《十大元帥大結局》、"The Mystery of Xiaoshan"《韶山之謎》、"The Last 28 days of Cultural Revolution"《文革最后的28天》、"Horror and Anti-horror"《恐怖與反恐怖》、"Human and Ghost"《人鬼神》、"Force of China"《中國力量》. Many are on current political and economic issues. For its 30th anniversary in 1982 it published a book called "Knowledge of living" with useful information on health care, electrical appliances and useful telephone numbers in Hong Kong and Guangzhou etc.. Some feature stories and articles in the newspaper are later collected and published as books.

Website 
The HKCD website (香港商報電子版-中國窗) was launched in 1996. It is written in both Traditional Chinese and Simplified Chinese characters.  The news is updated at midnight, before publication of the paper. People from all over the world can access freely the online news about Hong Kong, Mainland China and the world. Past news and features are accessible through a searchable archive.

See also
 Newspapers of Hong Kong
 List of newspapers
 Hong Kong Audit Bureau of Circulations

References

External links
 Official site with updated news and stock market data
China News 
Shenzhen Press Group
Hong Kong Newspaper

Notes and references
Hong Kong Commercial Daily [microform] (香港商報 [縮微資料]). Hong Kong Special Collection, Main Library of University of Hong Kong, 1952.
金庸茶館
RTHK 
Hong Kong Commercial Daily(香港商報電子版-中國窗)

Business newspapers published in Hong Kong
Chinese-language newspapers published in Hong Kong
Newspapers established in 1952
Propaganda newspapers and magazines
State media
Chinese propaganda organisations
1952 establishments in Hong Kong